is a Japanese rally driver and team owner. He is the first Japanese FIA world champion.

Arai was born in Isesaki, Gunma. He made his debut in 1987 and drove for the Subaru World Rally Team in the Group N World Rally Championship from 1997–2000 and 2002–2003, and in the Group A Championship in 2000–2001.

In 2004 he established his own team, Subaru Team Arai, and won the FIA Production Car World Rally Championship for Drivers in 2005 and 2007 driving a Subaru Impreza WRX STI, which made him the first Japanese FIA world champion. He scored class victories in Turkey, Japan and Australia on his way to the title.

He was also the winner of the short-lived FIA Teams' Cup in 2000.

Career results

WRC results

PWRC results

IRC results

European Rally Championship results

Complete World Touring Car Championship results
(key) (Races in bold indicate pole position) (Races in italics indicate fastest lap)

Complete Global Rallycross results

Supercar

Race cancelled.

References

External links

Profile at World Rally Archive 
Profile and results at Rallybase

1966 births
Living people
Japanese rally drivers
World Rally Championship drivers
Intercontinental Rally Challenge drivers
World Touring Car Championship drivers
Global RallyCross Championship drivers
European Rally Championship drivers